This article lists the main modern pentathlon events and their results for 2001.

International modern pentathlon events
 September 28: 2001 CISM Modern Pentathlon Championships in  Warendorf
 Winner:  Sergio Salazar

World modern pentathlon events
 July 16: 2001 World Modern Pentathlon Championships in  Millfield
 Individual winners:  Gábor Balogh (m) /  Steph Cook (f)
 August 2: 2001 World Junior Modern Pentathlon Championships in  Budapest
 Junior Individual winners:  Michal Michalík (m) /  Tatiana Gorliak (f)
 Junior Men's Team Relay winners:  (Ali Assem, Raouf El-Raouf, & Mohamed Abdel Raouf)
 Junior Women's Team Relay winners:  (Nora Simoka, Vivien Mathe, & Eva Sasvari)
 August 28: 2001 World Youth "A" Modern Pentathlon Championships in  Uppsala
 Youth Individual winners:  Robert Liptak (m) /  Anastasiya Prokopenko (f)

Continental modern pentathlon events
 Note 1: There is a discrepancy between three European cities as the main European MP Championships one.
 Note 2: The men's EMPC (Sofia) results are not complete. Therefore, it is not definitive here.
 June 18: 2001 European Modern Pentathlon Championships in  Sofia
 Winner:  Steph Cook
 July 2: 2001 European Modern Pentathlon Championships (Women) in  Ústí nad Labem
 Winner:  Nora Simoka
 July 12: 2001 European Youth "A" Modern Pentathlon Championships in  Spała
 Youth Individual winners:  Dmitriy Telegin (m) /  Tatiana Gorliak (f)
 August 15: 2001 European Modern Pentathlon Championships (Men) in  Melilla
 Winner:  Petr Lébl

2001 Modern Pentathlon World Cup
 Note 1: The MPWC #3 for Men (May 11) does not have any results on its UIPM page.
 Note 2: The MPWC #4 for Women (August 11) does not have any results on its UIPM page.
 March 17: MPWC #1 in  Mexico City
 Individual winners:  Edvinas Krungolcas (m) /  Georgina Harland
 April 28: MPWC #2 for Men in  Warendorf
 Winner:  Sandor Fulep
 April 29: MPWC #2 for Women in  Székesfehérvár
 Winner:  Georgina Harland
 May 11: MPWC #3 for Women in  Bath
 Winner:  Steph Cook
 August 12: MPWC #4 (Men; final) in  Moscow
 Winner:  Edvinas Krungolcas

References

External links
 Union Internationale de Pentathlon Moderne Website (UIPM)

Modern pentathlon
2001 in sports